Luciano Velardi (born 20 August 1981) is an Italian football player. He spent one season in the Bundesliga with VfL Bochum.

External links
 
 

1981 births
Living people
Italian footballers
VfL Bochum players
VfL Bochum II players
KFC Uerdingen 05 players
SSVg Velbert players
Association football midfielders
Association football forwards
Bundesliga players